ARVØ (born 1992 in Erlabrunn as Raphael Schmiedel) is a German musician and producer.

Personal life 
In the age of 10 ARVØ discovered his interest in electronic music and started producing own songs. Subsequently he worked as a DJ in the region Zwickau. Later in September 2017 resident in Tallinn ARVØ met with the composer Arvo Pärt. 

The first music was published in December 2018. The song "Northward Bound" was released on the compilation Tour de Traum XVI by the Cologne based label Traum Schallplatten. ARVØ was put together with artists like Dominik Eulberg, Max Cooper or Ryan Davis.  

In March 2019 ARVØ released a remix of the song "Lell´o", which won 3rd prize for Song of the year 2018 in Estonia) by the Estonian band Trad.Attack!. 

The EP "Pirita" was published in August 2020 in the label Wanderlust by Leipzig based DJane .

Musical style 
ARVØ can be assigned to the genres Techno and Electronica. Special feature is the integration of the instrument violin which he plays since the age of 5. Sometimes his music is described as Violintechno.

Discography

EPs 

 2019: Dream Off (Deep Hype Sounds)
2019: Sunrise (Antrieb Musik)
 2020: Güzell (Sonderling Berlin)
 2020: Hands on Silki
 2020: Pirita (Wanderlust)
2020: Choice Of Life incl. Niklas Worgt Remix (Fruehling)

Singles 

 2018: Northward Bound (Traum Schallplatten)

Remixes 

 2019: Trad.Attack! – Lell’o (ARVØ Remix)
 2020: Mr. Mojo - Trip around the sun (ARVØ Remix)

References

External links 

Official website

German electronic musicians
German record producers